Bernd Gerdes (born 3 November 1989) is a German professional footballer who plays as a midfielder for SV Bevern.

External links

1989 births
Living people
People from Cloppenburg
Footballers from Lower Saxony
German footballers
Association football midfielders
SV Werder Bremen II players
KSV Hessen Kassel players
SV Bevern players
3. Liga players